The original Vulcan Gas Company (usually called simply Vulcan) was the first successful psychedelic music venue in Austin, Texas. The Vulcan opened its doors at 316 Congress Avenue in the fall of 1967, and closed in the summer of 1970. Gary Scanlon, Houston White, Don Hyde and Sandy Lockett started the VGC. By 1969, management was primarily by White and Lockett, along with Jim Franklin. There was a substantial sound system installed by Sandy Lockett. Charlie Sauer was the principal audio engineer for the last year of operation. Bobby Hedderman and Marty McDermott managed the club for the last few months. Underground cartoonist Gilbert Shelton became their art director in 1967 and drew their weekly posters.

In an interview with Don Hyde by Eddie Wilson 2010, Hyde said that the landlord had tremendous pressure from everywhere to throw them out. He went down to the VGC a couple of times, unannounced, on a Saturday night, walked around and said “I just don’t see what everyone is so upset about. It just looks like young people having fun. It is loud! But to each his own.” He told Hyde that as long as the rent was paid--$350 a month—they could stay.

A name plaque for the Vulcan is still on the front wall of the historic W.B. Smith building, named after the dry goods store which first occupied the building in 1884.  In 1967 this end of the street leading to the Texas Capitol was not particularly prosperous and rents were relatively low.

The Vulcan provided a concert stage for unconventional bands of various genres, most notably the 13th Floor Elevators and the Conqueroo. By 1969, Shiva's Headband became the de facto house band, and in the first half of 1970 the Hub City Movers played frequently at the Vulcan.

The club had homemade benches and old church pews for the audience. The main floor, in front of the stage, was used for dancing. The club owner(s) always wanted all ages to attend and even gave passes out to Jr. High kids who would pass handbills out at lunchtime. Smoking marijuana inside the club was discouraged and rare. Alcohol was discouraged, but common. For some time, the Vulcan used space in the adjoining building to the north for selling sandwiches and soft drinks and as office space, but this auxiliary space was eventually abandoned to reduce rent.

Since there was no liquor license and beer could not be sold, almost all of the income came from gate receipts, typically $1.50 per person. That was the main cause of the club's ultimate demise. Johnny Winter, as a favor to White and Lockett, played a benefit concert, along with the Hub City Movers, March 10 & 11, 1970. Even that concert was not enough to offset ominous financial difficulties.

The elevated stage at the northwest end of the hall was rustic, but the psychedelic light show offset that appearance. The light show was operated from a suspended platform on the south side of the room and near the ceiling - reached by a ladder. There was a large horizontal drain pipe across the back of the stage—that pipe is prominent in many photos of performances at the Vulcan.

There is one feature that most customers never saw, but is still a part of the Vulcan legend: the freight elevator. It was in the back, next to the doors that opened onto the alley. Made of wood and powered by human muscle via a rope that worked a reel of steel cable. The ride up was difficult, but the ride down could be precarious. The cable often got snarled and had to be unsnarled by hand.

For much of the history, concerts were advertised with both large posters and letter-sized handbills, similar to those produced for concerts at the Avalon Ballroom and The Fillmore. Gradually, the larger posters were sacrificed to save cost, and eventually the handbills were abandoned for the same reason. Comprehensive collections are available online.

Present Day 
The new Vulcan Gas Company at 418 E 6th St which opened in 2014 adopted the name, but is otherwise unrelated to the original venue. The club features stand up comedy and EDM shows. The club is owned by Nick Franceschini.  The venue is 9,500 sq feet, spans over 2 floors (658 person standing room capacity) and features a green room, catering room, 7 men’s & 7 women’s bathrooms, 2 large bars, and an outdoor terrace. The outdoor patio features a mural of comedians drawn by a local Austin artist.   

Vulcan Gas Company has been home to the Kill Tony podcast on Monday nights since May 2021 when the podcast moved from Antone's Nightclub. The podcast spotlights stand up comedy. Joe Rogan has hosted multiple shows per month at the club alongside other local Austin stand up comics. Big Laugh Comedy produces several stand-up comedy shows per week including hosting headliners and stand up comedy showcases for local and touring comics. Several stand up comedians including Rocky Dale Davis, Matt Rife, and Willie Barcena, have filmed their stand up specials at Vulcan Gas Company.

Acts that played at the Vulcan (Congress Ave) 

13th Floor Elevators
1948
Afro Caravan
Angela, Lewis and the Fabulous Rockets
Austin Suburban Loan Co
BB King
Birth
Blues Bag
Bubble Puppy
Big Joe Williams
Big Sweet
Canned Heat
Captain Beefheart
Children
Conqueroo
Consolidated Smoke House Limited
James Cotton
Endel St. Cloud in the Rain
Eternal Life Corp.
Sleepy John Estes
Fat Emma
Fugs
Georgetown Medical Band
The Golden Dawn
Good Humor
Grits
John Lee Hooker
Lightnin' Hopkins
Hub City Movers
Jomo
Freddie King
Mance Lipscomb
Liquid Marble
Lord August and The Visions of Life
Lost and Found
Fred McDowell
Moby Grape
Mother Earth
Mustangs
Naked Letus
New Atlantis
New Moan Hey
Night Hog
Ohio Express
Onion Creek
Poco
Ramon Ramon and the 4 Daddyos
Jimmy Reed
Rubaiyat
Salt
Sex Swing
Shepherd's Head
Sherwood
Shiva's Headband
Sky Blues
South Canadian Overflow
Space American Eagle Squadron
Strawberry Shoemaker
Steve Miller Band
Sunnyland Special
Swiss Movement
Texas, with Jimmie Vaughan, Denny Freeman, Paul Ray
Texas Pacific
Texas Rangers
Zakary Thaks
Thingies
Big Mama Thornton
Velvet Underground
United Gas
Untouchables
Water Brothers
Muddy Waters
Wild Chickens
Big Joe Williams
Johnny Winter
Zig Zag Quartet

See also

 Music of Austin

References

External links
 Official website

Buildings and structures in Austin, Texas
Former music venues in the United States
Music of Austin, Texas
Music venues in Austin, Texas